Jarkko Huovila (born 15 November 1975) is a Finnish orienteering competitor and World Champion. He participated on the Finnish winning team in the 2001 World Orienteering Championships. He also has silver medals from the 2003 and 2006 Team Events, and individual medals from the Short Distance (silver in 2006, and a bronze in 2005).

See also
 Finnish orienteers
 List of orienteers
 List of orienteering events

References

External links

1975 births
Living people
Finnish orienteers
Male orienteers
Foot orienteers
World Orienteering Championships medalists
Competitors at the 2001 World Games
Junior World Orienteering Championships medalists